Charactorama is a teaching method that uses storytelling and drama to motivate learners and help them to pay attention and remember what is learnt.

Affective domain
Charactorama - a compound of ‘Character’ and ‘-orama’ - is an educational method aiming to reach the learner's affective domain, which is related to a person's interests, attitudes, values, emotions and beliefs.

‘Affective domain’ covers a wide range: from simply giving attention to something, to character and conscience which are complex and internally consistent. B.S. Bloom and others classified affective domain's goal as follows:
 Receiving: Learner tries to accept phenomenon and stimulation or gives attention and shows interest to them; Sensing, self-supervision and attention concentration are included in receiving.
 Responding: ‘Respond’ to something more than giving simple attention; Passive obedience are included.
 Valuing: 
 Organizing: As learners internalize several values, they can systemize those values into one value and choose dominating value when they meet the situation that several values are related; Conceptualization of value and organization with value system are included in this stage.
 Characterization by a value or value complex: A domain which makes people act consistently by internalizing value; generalized action and personalization are included.

Design principle
Charactorama is a story telling and drama technique which is considered an effective way of stimulating learners’ emotion, changing attitude through shared learning experience and imagination, and creating new action. Students create and tell a story, in the following stages:

 Story composition - Compose a story based on story telling's 6 components and 3 plots to imagine specific future vividly and make people receive message deeply.
 Story reinforcement - Choose proper character toy based on characters’ personality and characteristics in the story. 
 Story telling - Add narration to prepared story and show it on a big screen. Evaluate each other and choose the greatest story. Lastly share the lesson learned from storytelling.

Expected effects

Attention
Focus on learning process by having 4 elements which determine learning motivation: attention, relevance, confidence and satisfaction.

Retention
Remember 90% of learning contents to express by speaking, writing and acting.

Learning aims
To understand abstract and ideological contents clearly.
To enhance will to achieve goal and set up specific future goal.
To give shape to one's dream and vision.

See also
 Instructional design

References

 Charactorama 

Learning methods
Education in South Korea